The Juno Awards of 2014 honoured Canadian music industry achievements in the latter part of 2012 and in most of 2013. The awards were presented in Winnipeg, Manitoba, Canada, during the weekend of 29–30 March 2014. The main ceremony took place at the MTS Centre and was televised on CTV.

Planning
In October 2012, CARAS announced that it selected Winnipeg as the host city for the 2014 Juno Awards. Winnipeg previously hosted in 2005. The other known bid was from Victoria, British Columbia, which planned to host the primary ceremony at the Save-On-Foods Memorial Centre.

Events
Juno Week events began on 24 March 2014:

 28–29 March – JunoFest concerts
 28 March – Juno Cup benefit hockey game at MTS Iceplex
 29 March – private gala at RBC Convention Centre where most awards were presented
 30 March – televised ceremony at the MTS Centre, where seven major awards were presented

Televised ceremony
The televised ceremony was hosted by Classified, Johnny Reid and Serena Ryder. Classified and Ryder jointly performed an opening song.

Performers included:

 Gord Bamford
 Dean Brody
 Classified
 Brett Kissel
 Matt Mays
 Sarah McLachlan
 OneRepublic
 Serena Ryder
 The Sheepdogs
 Tegan and Sara
 Walk off the Earth

Dallas Green (City and Colour) cancelled his originally scheduled appearance on the broadcast, citing a wish that a new Juno nominee be allowed to perform instead.

Robin Thicke was originally scheduled to perform, but cancelled his appearance shortly before the broadcast, claiming that he was under a "mandatory vocal rest".

Nominees and winners
The Allan Waters Humanitarian Award was presented to Chantal Kreviazuk and Raine Maida. Frank Davies is the 2014 Walt Grealis Special Achievement Award recipient for his work in the recording industry. Bachman–Turner Overdrive were inducted into the Canadian Music Hall of Fame, introduced by astronaut Chris Hadfield.

Nominees were announced on 4 February 2014, based on music released during the eligibility window from 1 September 2012 to 13 November 2013.

People

Albums

Songs and recordings

Other

References

2014 music awards
2013
Music festivals in Winnipeg
Events in Winnipeg
2014 in Canadian music
March 2014 events in Canada
2014 in Manitoba